The 1986 RTHK Top 10 Gold Songs Awards was held in 1986 for the 1985 music season.

Top 10 song awards
The top 10 songs (十大中文金曲) of 1986 are as follows.

Other awards

References
 RTHK top 10 gold song awards 1986

RTHK Top 10 Gold Songs Awards
Rthk Top 10 Gold Songs Awards, 1986
Rthk Top 10 Gold Songs Awards, 1986